Letters from Lexington: Reflections on Propaganda, first published in 1993, contains Noam Chomsky's criticism of the American media.
The articles are available in parts on the Noam Chomsky Archive.

Contents
Foreword by Edward S. Herman

What Makes the Mainstream Media Mainstream 
The Middle East Lie 
Defensive Aggression 
The Sunday Times Makes for a Day of No Rest 
Notes on the Culture of Democracy 
Third World, First Threat 
Yearning for Democracy 
Apostles of Nonviolence 
UN = US 
Postscript: "Riding Moynihan's Hobby Horse" 
Our "Sense of Moral Purpose" 
"We the People" 
Bringing Peace 
The Burdens of Responsibility 
The Death and Life of Stalinism 
Toxic Omissions 
"Fiendish Acts" 
The PC Thought Police 
Rest in Peace
Class struggle as Usual

External links
 
 
 ZNet

Books by Noam Chomsky
Lexington, Massachusetts
1993 non-fiction books